Blindside is the debut studio album by Swedish Christian rock band Blindside, released on Solid State Records in 1997.  It was re-released by DRT Entertainment on May 10, 2005 with four unreleased demo tracks.

Track listing

United States
 "Invert" – 3:06
 "Born" – 3:28
 "Empty Box" – 4:05
 "Superman" – 2:43
 "Nerve" – 2:45
 "This Shoulder" – 3:15
 "Replay" – 2:46
 "One Mind" – 4:12
 "Liberty" – 3:13
 "Daughter" – 2:24
 "Teddy Bear" – 4:27
 "Never" – 4:26

2005 re-release bonus tracks
 "Superman (Demo Version)" - 2:40
 "Liberty (Demo Version)" - 2:52
 "Forgiven (Demo)" - 2:42
 "Stolen (Demo)" - 2:32

The bonus tracks are printed in wrong order on the back of the CD cover. It switches places on Liberty and Superman, and Stolen and Forgiven.

Europe
 "Daughter" - 2:25
 "Liberty" - 3:15
 "Nerve" - 2:48
 "Superman" - 2:48
 "Invert" - 3:09
 "This Shoulder" - 3:17
 "One Mind" - 4:19
 "Sidewinder" - 4:25
 "Never + Lova Herren" - 6:17

Japan
 "Daughter" - 2:25
 "Liberty" - 3:15
 "Nerve" - 2:48
 "Superman" - 2:48
 "Invert" - 3:09
 "This Shoulder" - 3:17
 "One Mind" - 4:19
 "Sidewinder" - 4:25
 "Never + Lova Herren" - 6:17
 "Empty Box" - 4:02
 "Born" - 3:27
 "Replay" - 2:45
 "Teddy Bear" - 4:29
 "Daughter (Demo Version)" - 2:36

Personnel

Christian Lindskog - vocals
Simon Grenehed - guitar
Tomas Näslund - bass
Marcus Dahlström - drums

References

Blindside (band) albums
1997 debut albums
Tooth & Nail Records albums
Solid State Records albums